Yamap is an Oceanic language in Morobe Province, Papua New Guinea.

External links 
 Paradisec has an open access collection that includes Yamap language materials from Meinrad Scheller

References

South Huon Gulf languages
Languages of Morobe Province